L. aurea  may refer to:
 Lalage aurea, the rufous-bellied triller, a bird species endemic to Indonesia
 Lamarckia aurea, the goldentop grass, a plant species originating from the Mediterranean area
 Lindmania aurea, a plant species endemic to Venezuela
 Litoria aurea, the green and golden bell frog, a ground-dwelling tree frog species native to eastern Australia
 Livia aurea, a fungus species

See also
 Aurea (disambiguation)